Michael Roll may refer to:

 Michael Roll (actor) (born 1961), German television actor
 Michael Roll (basketball) (born 1987), Tunisian-American professional basketball player
 Michael Roll (pianist) (born 1946), British pianist

See also
Michel Rolle, French mathematician